The 2021 Table Mountain fire (also known as the Rhodes Memorial fire or Cape Town fire) is a major fire that started on 18 April 2021 in and around Table Mountain National Park and the neighbourhoods of Newlands, Rosebank, Mowbray and Rondebosch in Cape Town, South Africa. The damage to sites in the Table Mountain area  included the Rhodes Memorial, where a restaurant  burned down; the upper campus of the University of Cape Town (UCT), where the Special Collections library was gutted; and Mostert's Mill, a historic windmill that burned down.  In addition, five firefighters were hospitalised.

Fire and response 

The wildfire started on the morning of 18 April 2021 near Rhodes Memorial, Devil's Peak in Table Mountain National Park. The fire was reported to have been started by a vagrant, and spread through old pine trees and debris, generating its own wind, towards the university campus and city. There was an extreme fire danger alert on the same day, with high temperature and low humidity.

Initially, the resulting smoke and wind updrafts caused by the fire prevented aerial firefighting support from being deployed. Later, over 250 firefighters were involved in fighting the fire and four helicopters were used to drop water onto the fire.

By 14:10 SAST, students at the University of Cape Town were evacuated. Official warnings were issued for hikers in the Newlands Forest area of Table Mountain National Park to also evacuate. At 16:05 SAST, South African National Parks (SANParks) announced that the restaurant at Rhodes Memorial had been destroyed in the fire. The M3 road was also closed, with the fire spreading to the other side of it.

On 19 April 2021 (8:00 SAST) homes in the Vredehoek, Walmer Estate and University Estate area of Cape Town were evacuated as a precautionary measure. This included the evacuation of the Disa Park residential complex. 

Casualties and damage

Firefighters 
On 19 April Western Cape Premier Alan Winde stated that a total of five firefighters were hospitalised.  At least four of them were hospitalised due to burn injuries.

Rhodes Memorial 
The fire burnt down a restaurant at the Rhodes Memorial and its adjoining chapel.

University of Cape Town 
More than six structures at the campus of the University of Cape Town suffered damage. Also affected was the special collections department of the UCT Libraries system, housed in Jagger Library, part of the research wing of UCT's main library.  Although a fire detection system prevented the fire from reaching the rest of the main library, the reading room of Jagger Library was gutted by the flames, and some of the rare collections in the special collections department, which held over 1,300 collections and over 85,000 books and other items, were likely lost. A later assessment found that a vast majority of the African Studies Published Print Collection (about 70,000 items) and the entirety of the African Studies Film Collection DVDs (about 3,500 items) had been destroyed, along with documents relating to the university itself as well as any manuscripts or archives being kept in the Reading Room for digitization or after being digitized, but that the rare and antique collections kept underground, including significant documentation and works of the San and Khoi people who lived in the area in the 1870s, had been preserved.

The H.W. Pearson building caught on fire, although the Bolus Herbarium housed within narrowly escaped destruction and water damage.  One of the damaged sections was the Plant Conservation Unit, which studies fossil pollen and compared historical photos of sites with the sites in the present day. Their photos are thought to have been digitized, and the sediment cores they were taken from were housed in a different area, but the fossil pollen lab itself was likely destroyed.

The fire also caused substantial damage to Cadbol House and La Grotta (administrative buildings) and to the Upper Campus student residences Smuts Hall and Fuller Hall. A number of other buildings suffered minor damage.

Mostert's Mill 
The fire also destroyed the Mostert's Mill, the oldest  working windmill in South Africa, built in 1796, and four thatched cottages behind it.

Newlands
The government reported that an unoccupied ministerial residence owned by the Department of Public Works and used by Labour Minister Thulas Nxesi had been “completely destroyed”.

Aftermath 

On , UCT vice-chancellor Mamokgethi Phakeng suspended all academic activities for the following two days. On , Phakeng said students could return to their residences within 72 hours, with the exception of those who lived in either Smuts Hall or Fuller Hall. She added that restoring Fuller Hall to a habitable condition could take months.

Investigation 

On  at 20:10 SAST, a 35-year-old man was arrested on suspicion of starting the blaze but later released due to a lack of evidence. An investigation into the cause of the fire by South African National Parks concluded that the fire was most likely started by arsonists in throwing a fire starting object out of a vehicle.

See also 

 Table Mountain fire (2000)
 Table Mountain fire (2006)
 Table Mountain fire (2009)
 2015 Western Cape fire season

References 

2021 meteorology
2021 in South Africa
2021 wildfires
2021 fires in Africa
2020s in Cape Town
April 2021 events in South Africa
Fires in Cape Town
Table Mountain
University of Cape Town
Fire season 2021
Wildfires in South Africa